Happy Ending is the third album by New Zealand band, The Phoenix Foundation. It was released in 2007.

Band member Richie Singleton described the album as "an attempt to capture how we play live".

"Bright Grey", "Bleaching Sun" and "40 Years" were released as singles. The music videos for "Bright Grey" and "40 Years" were directed by Taika Waititi.

Track listing
"Bright Grey" – 5:03
"Bleaching Sun" – 4:29
"Slumber Party" – 4:20
"Gandalf" – 6:02
"40 Years"  – 4:33
"Irrelevant Noise" – 3:59
"A Day In The Sun" – 2:34
"Pure Joy" – 4:27
"No One Will Believe Me When I'm Dead" – 3:30
"Omerta" – 5:30
"Burning Wreck" – 4:27
"Sugar" – 2:39

References

2007 albums
The Phoenix Foundation albums
Flying Nun Records albums